Briana DeSouza  (born 22 May 1991) is a women's international footballer who plays as a defender. Born in Canada, she co-captains the Guyana national team and competed at the 2016 CONCACAF Women's Olympic Qualifying Championship.

Career
From 2009 to 2013, she attended Carleton University, playing for the women's soccer team, captaining the team in her final year. In 2011, she was named an OUA All-Star. She was named an OUA East All-Star in 2012.

In 2013, she signed with the Ottawa Fury of the USL W-League.

From 2015 through 2019, she played with Durham United FA in League1 Ontario. In 2015, she was named a league First Team All-Star. In 2016, she played 15 matches, making her debut on 8 May against the Kingston Clippers. In 2017, she made another 15 appearances, scoring her first goal on 30 August against the Toronto Azzurri Blizzard, and was a league Second Team All-Star. She made 9 appearances in each of the 2018 and 2019 seasons, once again being named a Second Team All-Star in 2019.

In 2021, she played with Vaughan Azzurri in League1 Ontario, making two regular season appearances and one playoff appearance.

Personal
DeSouza is of Guyanese heritage on her father's side, where her grandfather was born, and Italian heritage on her mother's side. Her sister, Kayla DeSouza also played for the Guyana national team.

See also
List of Guyana women's international footballers

References

External links
 Durham United FC player profile
 Ravens player profile
 

1991 births
Living people
Citizens of Guyana through descent
Guyanese women's footballers
Women's association football defenders
Guyana women's international footballers
Sportspeople from Scarborough, Toronto
Soccer players from Toronto
Canadian women's soccer players
Guyanese people of Italian descent
Canadian sportspeople of Guyanese descent
Canadian people of Italian descent
Vaughan Azzurri (women) players
Carleton Ravens women's soccer players
Pickering FC (women) players
League1 Ontario (women) players
Ottawa Fury (women) players
USL W-League (1995–2015) players